Spintharus flavidus is a species of cobweb spider in the family Theridiidae. It is found in a range from the United States to Bolivia and Brazil.

References

Further reading

External links

 

Theridiidae
Articles created by Qbugbot
Spiders described in 1850
Spiders of the United States
Spiders of Central America
Spiders of South America
Spiders of Mexico